Son of God is a title historically claimed by several figures to imply their divinity, and used in various religious contexts.

Son of God may also refer to:
 Son of God (Christianity), the title's use in Christianity to refer to Jesus
 God the Son, a closely related title, also refers to Jesus Christ
 Sons of God, a phrase used in the Hebrew Bible and in Christian apocrypha, referring especially to angels
 Son of God (TV series), a 2001 BBC TV program
 Son of God, a song by Starfield from the álbum Beauty in the Broken
 Son of God (album), a 2012 album by Young Noble
 Son of God (film), a 2014 American biblical drama film

See also
 Divi filius, a Latin phrase meaning "divine son"
 Son of the Gods, a 1930 American romantic drama film